The Defenders is an American legal comedy-drama television series that was ordered to series by CBS for the 2010–11 television season. The series originally ran from September 22, 2010 to March 11, 2011. Set in Las Vegas, Nevada, the show involves a pair of defense attorneys who go all out to help their clients while keeping their personal lives in order. The show is loosely based on real-life Vegas lawyers Michael Cristalli and Marc Saggese. This series is not related to the 1960s CBS series of the same name.

In October 2010, CBS announced that the show had been picked up for a 18-episode season with the option to produce a full 22-episode season. In January 2011, CBS announced that The Defenders was moving from its Wednesday timeslot to the Friday timeslot vacated by Medium which aired on NBC and then CBS for seven seasons, with Blue Bloods temporarily moving to the timeslot The Defenders vacated. Blue Bloods returned to its Friday timeslot in February 2011 owing to the series premiere of Criminal Minds: Suspect Behavior. The Defenders aired the last six episodes of its season on Fridays at 8:00 p.m. Eastern/7:00 p.m. Central. Jim Belushi and Jerry O'Connell star as the defense attorneys of the show's title.

On May 15, 2011, CBS canceled the series after one season.

Cast and characters

Main
Jerry O'Connell as Pete Kaczmarek, a freewheeling playboy lawyer
Jim Belushi as Nick Morelli, Pete's partner, who is very passionate about his work and the clients he helps
Jurnee Smollett-Bell as Lisa Tyler, a young lawyer who worked her way through law school as a dancer
Tanya Fischer as Zoey Waters, Pete and Nick's assistant

Recurring
Gillian Vigman as Jessica, Nick's estranged wife
Teddy Sears as Thomas Cole, a prosecuting attorney
Glynn Turman as Judge Bob Owens
Dan Aykroyd as Judge Maximus Hunter

Episodes

References

External links

2010s American comedy-drama television series
2010s American workplace comedy television series
2010s American workplace drama television series
2010 American television series debuts
2011 American television series endings
2010s American legal television series
CBS original programming
Television series by CBS Studios
Television shows set in Las Vegas